A Place in the Caribbean is a 2017 Honduran drama/romance film written and directed by Juan Carlos Fanconi.

Production

A Honduran-American coproduction, A Place in the Caribbean was filmed in 2016 in Roatán, Honduras and Los Angeles.

Synopsis

On the Caribbean resort island of Roatán, a group of people seek love, but their pasts threaten to catch up with them.

Cast

 José Zúñiga – Gael Castillo 
 Gabriela de la Garza – Camila 
 Gastón Pauls – Fernando 
 Lali Gonzalez – Sofía 
 Rodrigo Guirao Díaz – Paolo 
 Daniel Zacapa – Marcelo 
 Jamie Bernadette – Sarah 
 Ana Clara Carranza – Ángela 
 Fermin Galeano – Sammy 
 Boris Barraza – Camila's father 
 Maria Elena Vindel – Victoria

Release
The film had its Honduran premiere on 23 March 2017. It was praised by local newspaper El Heraldo as the first Honduran romance film of genuine quality.

References

External links
 
 Official site (archived version)
Official Facebook page

2017 films
2017 romantic drama films
Honduran films
2010s Spanish-language films
Films set in Honduras
Films directed by Juan Carlos Fanconi